Buehler's Fresh Foods, also known as Buehler's, is a grocery store chain founded in 1929 in New Philadelphia, Ohio, US, by Ed and Helen Buehler. In 1932, Buehler's opened its second location in Wooster, Ohio.

Buehler's is the largest purchaser of local Amish produce at the Mt. Hope Auction. The company also sources dairy and meats from local and/or sustainable farms.

On October 18, 2017, Buehler's parent company, E&H Family Group, announced its decision to sell the 13 supermarkets to employees in the form of an employee stock ownership program (ESOP). The ESOP will be operated by the newly formed Buehler’s Fresh Foods, led by an experienced team of Buehler’s veterans, including Dan Shanahan, Buehler’s Fresh Foods president and COO since 2011, Rick Lowe, VP of Human Resources of E&H Family Group since 1977, and Mike Davidson, VP of Store Operations since 2015.

Other Business Ventures
E&H Hardware Group, a subsidiary of E&H Family Group, continues to operate 25 hardware stores in Ohio under the E&H Ace Hardware name. The Buehler's ESOP sale has no impact on E&H Hardware Group.

Closing of Stores 
 On January 4, 2016, Buehler's announced its intention to permanently close its Delaware supermarket, at 800 West Central Avenue, Delaware, Ohio. In that release, Buehler's stated that the anticipated closing date would be mid-to-late February 2016 and cited competition in the Delaware market and failed turnaround initiatives as the main reason for the closure. This marked the first closure of a supermarket, not relating to a move, in the company's history. The Delaware store officially closed on February 13, 2016, affecting 131 employees. The closing reduced the supermarkets in the company from 15 to 14.
 Late in the afternoon on Monday, September 26, 2016, Buehler's announced in an official press release the closure of its Brunswick supermarket, at 3688 Center Road, Brunswick, Ohio. Buehler's stated that the supermarket had been under-performing for some time in the competitive Medina County market. 125 workers were affected as a result of the supermarket closing. The last official day of business at the Brunswick location was October 21, 2016. This cut Buehler’s supermarket roster from 14 to 13.

References

External links
 Official website

Supermarkets of the United States
Retail companies established in 1929
Companies based in Ohio
Tuscarawas County, Ohio
1929 establishments in Ohio